The Seder for the night of Rosh Hashanah being Judaic Minhag the compleate eating of symbolic aliments, reciting psalms during the Supper of Rosh HaShanah.
Generally for symbolic foods that shall be eaten during the Seder it is known the Simanim (symbolic aliments) order and are provided together "blessings" and "worships".

At the Rosh Hashanah seder, special foods known as simanim (signs) are served.

History
According to author Rahel Musleah, the tradition of holding a seder on Rosh Hashanah is at least 2000 years old. It has especially been practiced among the Sephardi communities of the Mediterranean region.

Foods
The following foods are traditionally eaten, though individual customs vary:
 Beets
 Dates
 Leeks
 Pomegranates
 Pumpkins
 Beans

Most commonly, a piece of apple is dipped in honey.

See also
Apples and honey

References

External links
Rosh Hashanah seder according to Sephardi customs

Rosh Hashanah
Jewish festive meals